HMS Pytchley was a Type I  destroyer of the Royal Navy which served in World War II. She was scrapped in 1956.

Service history
Pytchley was ordered on 11 April 1939 under the 1939 War Emergency Build Programme as job number J111. She was completed on 23 October 1940. She was adopted by the Municipal Borough of Kettering in Northamptonshire as part of Warship Week in 1942.

She earned battle honours during the Second World War for the North Sea 1941–1945, where she spent the majority of her service. During 1941 she struck a mine off Flamborough Head and was subsequently repaired on the River Tyne. In June 1944 she formed part of the naval escort supporting the Normandy landings, providing support during the assault on Gold Beach.

Following the war she was employed as an aircraft target ship in December 1945. She then transferred to the Reserve Fleet at Devonport in 1946.

She remained there until sold to BISCO for scrap. She arrived at the breakers yard at Llanlley on 1 December 1956.

References

Publications
 
 

 

1940 ships
Hunt-class destroyers of the Royal Navy
Naval ships of Operation Neptune
World War II destroyers of the United Kingdom